The Zlatonosović family was a medieval Bosnian noble family.

The family was first attested in 1389. They sided with Sandalj Hranić and Radoslav Pavlović in 1427, when King Stephen Tvrtko II acknowledged Hungarian suzerainty by recognizing Hermann II of Celje as his heir presumptive and marrying Dorothy Garai. They did not attend the wedding. During the conflict between Tvrtko II and Serbian ruler Đurađ Branković they sided with Serbia and conquered the region of Zvornik. In 1430, Tvrtko II defeated Pavle Zlatonosović and reincorporated his territories into his realm. Zlatonosović's defeat marks the last mention of the family in historical records.

Members
Vukmir
Vukašin
Pavle

Sources

Kingdom of Bosnia
Bosnian noble families